Departed may refer to:
The Departed, a 2006 film directed by Martin Scorsese
"Right Here (Departed)", a 2008 song by Brandy

See also
 The Departed (disambiguation)